H3 is a film released in 2001 about the 1981 Irish hunger strike at HM Prison Maze in Northern Ireland, the events leading up to it, and subsequent developments in the prisoners' struggle for Prisoner of War status. It was directed by Les Blair and was written by Brian Campbell and Laurence McKeown; McKeown was a former volunteer in the Provisional IRA who participated in the hunger strike.

Cast
 Brendan Mackey as Seamus Scullion
 Dean Lennox Kelly as Ciaran
 Aidan Campbell as Declan
 Tony Devlin as Madra
 Kevin Elliot as Liam
 Mark O'Halloran as Bobby Sands
 Sean McDonagh as Proinsias
 Fergal McElherron as Francis Hughes
 Mark McCrory as Morton
 Dan Gordon as Simpson
 Gerry O'Brien as The Governor

Awards
The film was nominated for four awards and won one of them, the Golden Rosa Camuna award at the Bergamo Film Meeting.

External links
 H3 Official website 

 
 H3 at the British Film Catalogue

2001 films
Northern Irish films
Irish drama films
Irish-language films
English-language Irish films
2001 drama films
Films about The Troubles (Northern Ireland)
Films about the Irish Republican Army
2000s prison drama films
Political drama films
Films set in Northern Ireland
Films based on actual events
1981 Irish hunger strike
2000s English-language films